The 1915 Wyoming Cowboys football team was an American football team that represented the University of Wyoming as a member of the Rocky Mountain Conference (RMC) during the 1915 college football season. In their first season under head coach John Corbett, the Cowboys compiled a 2–6 record (1–5 against conference opponents), tied for sixth place in the RMC, and were outscored by a total of 213 to 46.

Schedule

References

Wyoming
Wyoming Cowboys football seasons
Wyoming Cowboys football